Prince {{nihongo|Shimazu Hisamitsu|島津 久光||November 28, 1817 – December 6, 1887}}, also known as , was a Japanese samurai of the late Edo period. Hisamitsu was virtual Super Potentate and virtual strongman of Satsuma Domain. The younger brother of Shimazu Nariakira, Hisamitsu served as regent for his underage son Tadayoshi, who became the 12th and last  of the Satsuma Domain. Hisamitsu was instrumental in the efforts of the southern Satsuma, Chōshū, and Tosa clans to bring down the Tokugawa Shogunate.

Biography

Hisamitsu was born in Kagoshima Castle in 1817, the son of Shimazu Narioki, the 10th daimyō; Hisamitsu's name at birth was Kanenoshin; his mother was Yura, Narioki's concubine. He was briefly adopted by the Tanegashima clan as an heir, but was returned to the Shimazu family while still a child. At age eight, he was adopted into the Shigetomi-Shimazu, a branch family of the main Shimazu house. Kanenoshin, now named Matajirō, came of age in 1828, and took the adult name .

At age 22, following his marriage to the daughter of the previous Shigetomi lord, Tadakimi, he inherited family headship. His half-brother Nariakira won the dispute and succeeded their father as lord of Satsuma; however, following Nariakira's death in 1858, Tadayuki's young son Mochihisa (later known as Tadayoshi) was chosen as the next lord of Satsuma. Tadayuki gained a position of primacy in Satsuma, due to his status as the lord's father. He returned to the main Shimazu house in 1861, and it was then that he changed his name to Hisamitsu.

In 1862, Hisamitsu went to Kyoto, and took part in the increasingly Kyoto-centered politics of the 1860s; he was a part of the kōbu-gattai political faction. It was during Hisamitsu's return from a stay in Edo, when three Englishmen on horseback offended his retainers by refusing to dismount or stand aside. Their failure to observe proper etiquette resulted in some argument, a chase, and one was killed, in what came to be known as the Namamugi Incident. Hisamitsu remained at the core of the kōbu-gattai movement in Kyoto, until Satsuma's secret alliance with men of Chōshu. He supported the Satsuma domain's military actions in the Boshin War, and retired soon after the Meiji Restoration. In the Meiji era, he was given the rank of duke, the highest of the newly-created kazoku nobility and which was awarded for his clan's participation during the Restoration.Even after this, the government struggled with the treatment of Hisamitsu and treated him with the highest class in ordination, honours, and conferrals. The government was careful about Hisamitsu, but that too disappeared after the deaths of Saigo and Okubo. It is said that Hisamitsu continued to say until the end, "Saigo was deceived by Okubo."

After the Meiji Restoration 
After the Meiji Restoration, Hisamitsu continued to hold real power in the Satsuma Domain (Kagoshima Domain). In the 4th year of Meiji (1871), the imperial government officials led by Saigo Takamori and Okubo Toshimitusu, who held government positions, issued an order to abolish the prefecture, which angered Hisamitsu in Kagoshima, and set off fireworks for an entire day in protest. In the old daimyo, Hisamitsu was the only one who was dissatisfied with the abolition of the domain. The "conspiracy of Choshu" was also outraged by the setting of the capital.
In September of the same year, the separation family was created Tamagi Shimazu house。

In Meiji 6 (1873), he served as a cabinet adviser to the government. For 7 years, he served as Minister of left and proposed to restore old customs, but he was completely excluded from the government's policy decision.

In the 8th year of Meiji (1875), he resigned as Minister of left and lived a secluded life in Kagoshima, concentrating on compiling and collecting the history books handed down by the Shimazu family.

Death
Hisamitsu died in December 6, 1887, at age 70. He was accorded a state funeral.

He is buried in Kagoshima Prefecture.

Honours
Grand Cordon of the Order of the Rising Sun (15 July 1881)
Prince (7 July 1884)
Grand Cordon of the Order of the Chrysanthemum (5 November 1887)

Order of precedence
Junior fourth rank (March 1864)
Fourth rank (16 May 1864)
Third rank (Sixth day, third month of the second year of Meiji (1869))
Second rank (13th day, ninth month of the fourth year of Meiji (1871))
Senior second rank (17 June 1879)
Junior first rank (21 September 1887)

Published works

Shimazu Hisamitsu rireki 島津久光履歴.
Shimazu Hisamitsu-kō jikki 島津久光公実紀 (1977). Tokyo: Tokyo Daigaku Shuppankai 東京大学出版会. (published posthumously)

Family tree

Ancestry 
The below are the ancestors of Shimazu Hisamitsu:

Works dealing with Hisamitsu
NHK Taiga Drama
Atsuhime (2008) Played by: Yuichiro Yamaguchi

See also 

Shimazu family
Namamugi Incident

References

Further reading
Kanbashi Norimasa 芳即正 (2002). Shimazu Hisamitsu to Meiji ishin: Hisamitsu wa naze, tōbaku wo ketsui shita ka 島津久光と明治維新 : 久光はなぜ, 討幕を決意したか. Tokyo: Shin Jinbutsu Ōraisha 新人物往来社.

1817 births
1887 deaths
Daimyo
Kazoku
People of Meiji-period Japan
Shimazu clan
People from Satsuma Domain
People from Kagoshima